Roger Jansson (born 9 August 1943 in Kimito) is a politician in the Åland Islands, an autonomous and unilingually Swedish territory of Finland. He has studied in Åbo Akademi.

 Member of Ålands lagting (Åland parliament) 2007-
 Åland Member of the Finnish parliament 2003-2007
 Member of Ålands lagting (Åland parliament) 1979-2003
 Minister of industry and trade 1999-2001
 Lantråd (premier of the government of Åland) 1995-1999
 Speaker of Ålands lagting 1994-1995
 Second deputy speaker Ålands lagting (Åland parliament) 1983 and 1991–1993

References

1943 births
Living people
People from Kimitoön
Premiers of Åland
Speakers of the Parliament of Åland
Members of the Parliament of Åland
Politicians from Åland
Åbo Akademi University alumni